St Paul's School Boat Club is a rowing club based on the River Thames at St Paul's School Boathouse, Barnes, London.

History
The boat club is owned by St Paul's School, London and rowing is a primary school sport due to its location on the River Thames.

The club has won the prestigious Princess Elizabeth Challenge Cup at the Henley Royal Regatta on seven occasions and has won both the Queen Mother Challenge Cup at the National Schools' Regatta and the Schools' Head of the River Race.

Honours

National Schools' Regatta

Henley Royal Regatta

Schools' Head of the River Race

British champions

References

Rowing clubs in England
Rowing clubs of the River Thames
Scholastic rowing in the United Kingdom